Copelatus is a large genus of small diving beetles. There are some 470 described species in the genus, found worldwide, but they are most diverse in tropical South America, Africa and South-East Asia. Copelatus are often black or brown in color, many species of Copelatus possessing visible longitudinal furrows down the dorsal side of the wings of both sexes.

Systematics
The genus Copelatus is divided into several subgenera (Colepatus, Papuadytes etc.), some of which are sometimes treated as separate genera. It may be paraphyletic with respect to the smaller Copelatinae genera Lacconectus and Aglymbus. The species include:

Species

 Copelatus abonnenci Guignot, 1939
 Copelatus acamas Guignot, 1955
 Copelatus advena Sharp, 1882
 Copelatus aemulus Bilardo & Rocchi, 1995
 Copelatus aequatorius Régimbart, 1899
 Copelatus aethiopicus Régimbart, 1906
 Copelatus agrias Guignot, 1954
 Copelatus aldabricus J.Balfour-Browne, 1950
 Copelatus alternatus Sharp, 1882
 Copelatus amaroides Guignot, 1952
 Copelatus amatolensis Omer-Cooper, 1965
 Copelatus amazonicus Régimbart, 1889
 Copelatus ambiguus Bertrand & Legros, 1975
 Copelatus anastomosans Guignot, 1952
 Copelatus andobonicus Guignot, 1960
 Copelatus andreinii Régimbart, 1905
 Copelatus andrewesi J.Balfour-Browne, 1939
 Copelatus angolensis Peschet, 1924
 Copelatus angustus Gschwendtner, 1932
 Copelatus annobomensis J.Balfour-Browne, 1939
 Copelatus anthracinus Régimbart, 1895
 Copelatus aphroditae Balke, 2003
 Copelatus apicalis Fairmaire, 1898
 Copelatus apuzzoi Bilardo & Rocchi, 1999
 Copelatus aruensis J.Balfour-Browne, 1939
 Copelatus assamensis Vazirani, 1970
 Copelatus assimilis Régimbart, 1895
 Copelatus ateles Guignot, 1955
 Copelatus atrosulcatus Régimbart, 1906
 Copelatus bacchusi Wewalka, 1981
 Copelatus bacillifer Guignot, 1955
 Copelatus baculiformis Guignot, 1955
 Copelatus badeni Sharp, 1882
 Copelatus bakewelli J.Balfour-Browne, 1939
 Copelatus bangalorensis Vazirani, 1970
 Copelatus baoulicus Bilardo & Pederzani, 1978
 Copelatus barbouri Young, 1942
 Copelatus basifasciatus Régimbart, 1895
 Copelatus basilewskyi Bilardo & Pederzani, 1979
 Copelatus bechynei Guignot, 1953
 Copelatus befasicus Guignot, 1956
 Copelatus bengalensis Guignot, 1955
 Copelatus bertrandi Nilsson, Bilardo & Rocchi, 1996
 Copelatus bibulus Guignot, 1948
 Copelatus biformis Sharp, 1882
 Copelatus bilunatus Guignot, 1955
 Copelatus binaghii Bilardo & Pederzani, 1978
 Copelatus biolleyi Guignot, 1952
 Copelatus biroi Guignot, 1956
 Copelatus biseriatus J.Balfour-Browne, 1939
 Copelatus biswasi Mukherjee & Sengupta, 1986
 Copelatus blancasi Guignot, 1958
 Copelatus blatchleyi Young, 1953
 Copelatus bolivianus Guignot, 1957
 Copelatus bombycinus Guignot, 1952
 Copelatus bonvouloiri Sharp, 1882
 Copelatus bottegoi Régimbart, 1895
 Copelatus boukali Hendrich & Balke, 1998
 Copelatus brancuccii Rocchi, 1979
 Copelatus brasiliensis Zimmermann, 1921
 Copelatus brevistrigatus Guignot, 1959
 Copelatus brivioi Rocchi, 1976
 Copelatus brullei Aubé, 1838
 Copelatus brunneus J.Balfour-Browne, 1939
 Copelatus buqueti Aubé, 1838
 Copelatus burgeoni Gschwendtner, 1930
 Copelatus caelatipennis Aubé, 1838
 Copelatus caelatus Guignot, 1952
 Copelatus caffer J.Balfour-Browne, 1939
 Copelatus camerunensis Guignot, 1941
 Copelatus capensis Sharp, 1882
 Copelatus carayoni Legros, 1949
 Copelatus carinatus Sharp, 1882
 Copelatus celinoides Guignot, 1952
 Copelatus cessaima Caetano, de C. Bena, & Vanin, 2013
 Copelatus ceylonicus Vazirani, 1969
 Copelatus cheesmanae J.Balfour-Browne, 1939
 Copelatus chevrolati Aubé, 1838
 Copelatus chibcha Guignot, 1952
 Copelatus chipiriricus Guignot, 1957
 Copelatus chloroticus Régimbart, 1899
 Copelatus cinnamomeus Régimbart, 1895
 Copelatus clarki Sharp, 1882
 Copelatus collarti Gschwendtner, 1932
 Copelatus compertus Guignot, 1956
 Copelatus concii Bilardo, 1982
 Copelatus concolor Sharp, 1882
 Copelatus concolorans J.Balfour-Browne, 1939
 Copelatus confinis Bilardo & Rocchi, 1999
 Copelatus congo Gschwendtner, 1938
 Copelatus consimilis Bilardo & Rocchi, 2002
 Copelatus consors Sharp, 1882
 Copelatus cooperae Bilardo & Pederzani, 1972
 Copelatus cordovai Megna & Epler, 2012
 Copelatus cordylinoides J.Balfour-Browne, 1938
 Copelatus coxalis Sharp, 1882
 Copelatus crassus Régimbart, 1895
 Copelatus cryptarchoides Régimbart, 1899
 Copelatus cubaensis Schaeffer, 1908
 Copelatus curtistriatus Bilardo & Rocchi, 1995
 Copelatus daemeli Sharp, 1882
 Copelatus danyi Megna & Epler, 2012
 Copelatus darlingtoni Young, 1942
 Copelatus debilis Sharp, 1882
 Copelatus decellei Bilardo, 1982
 Copelatus decemsulcatus Régimbart, 1895
 Copelatus deceptor Bilardo & Rocchi, 1995
 Copelatus depressus Sharp, 1882
 Copelatus descarpentriesi Bertrand & Legros, 1975
 Copelatus diffisus Guignot, 1939
 Copelatus dimorphus Sharp, 1882
 Copelatus distinctus Aubé, 1838
 Copelatus distinguendus Régimbart, 1903
 Copelatus divisus Watts, 1978
 Copelatus dolosus Guignot, 1956
 Copelatus doriae Sharp, 1882
 Copelatus duodecimstriatus Aubé, 1838
 Copelatus duponti Aubé, 1838
 Copelatus edax Guignot, 1955
 Copelatus efoutensis Bilardo & Rocchi, 1995
 Copelatus ejactus Omer-Cooper, 1965
 Copelatus ellai Bilardo & Rocchi, 1995
 Copelatus elutus Guignot, 1958
 Copelatus enganensis Guignot, 1940
 Copelatus epactus Guignot, 1948
 Copelatus erichsonii Guérin-Méneville, 1849
 Copelatus esteriensis Bilardo & Pederzani, 1978
 Copelatus eucritus Guignot, 1952
 Copelatus evanidus Bilardo & Rocchi, 1995
 Copelatus exaratus Sharp, 1882
 Copelatus externus Kirsch, 1873
 Copelatus fasciatus Bilardo & Rocchi, 1995
 Copelatus fastidiosus Guignot, 1959
 Copelatus feae Régimbart, 1888
 Copelatus fernandensis Guignot, 1952
 Copelatus ferruginicollis Régimbart, 1895
 Copelatus ferus Guignot, 1953
 Copelatus festae Régimbart, 1899
 Copelatus fidschiensis Zimmermann, 1928
 Copelatus fijiensis Guignot, 1955
 Copelatus filiformis Sharp, 1882
 Copelatus flavicans Guignot, 1952
 Copelatus flavidus Régimbart, 1895
 Copelatus fluviaticus Guignot, 1957
 Copelatus fontanus J.Balfour-Browne, 1950
 Copelatus fossilis Riha, 1974
 Copelatus fractistriatus Bilardo & Rocchi, 1995
 Copelatus freudei Guignot, 1955
 Copelatus fryi J.Balfour-Browne, 1939
 Copelatus fulviceps J.Balfour-Browne, 1938
 Copelatus fuscipennis Sharp, 1882
 Copelatus fuscomaculatus Guignot, 1952
 Copelatus gabonicus Bilardo & Pederzani, 1978
 Copelatus galapagoensis G.R.Waterhouse, 1845
 Copelatus garambanus Guignot, 1955
 Copelatus gardineri Scott, 1912
 Copelatus geayi Régimbart, 1904
 Copelatus geniculatus Sharp, 1882
 Copelatus gentilis Sharp, 1882
 Copelatus gestroi Régimbart, 1892
 Copelatus gibsoni Vazirani, 1974
 Copelatus glyphicus (Say, 1823)
 Copelatus griffinii Régimbart, 1899
 Copelatus gschwendtneri Guignot, 1939
 Copelatus guadelupensis Legros, 1948
 Copelatus guerini Aubé, 1838
 Copelatus guineensis Guignot, 1955
 Copelatus hararensis Guignot, 1952
 Copelatus hardenbergi J.Balfour-Browne, 1950
 Copelatus hebeter Guignot, 1953
 Copelatus heterogynus Régimbart, 1899
 Copelatus hydroporoides (Murray, 1859)
 Copelatus ibrahimi Zalat, Saleh, Angus & Kaschef, 2000
 Copelatus iguelaensis Bilardo & Rocchi, 2002
 Copelatus ilybioides Régimbart, 1895
 Copelatus imasakai Matsui & Kitayama, 2000
 Copelatus imitator Bilardo & Rocchi, 2002
 Copelatus inaequalis Sharp, 1882
 Copelatus incognitus Sharp, 1882
 Copelatus indicus Sharp, 1882
 Copelatus inopinatus Bilardo & Rocchi, 1995
 Copelatus inornatus Sharp, 1882
 Copelatus insidiosus Bilardo & Rocchi, 1995
 Copelatus insolitus Chevrolat, 1863
 Copelatus instabilis Régimbart, 1897
 Copelatus instriatus Zimmermann, 1921
 Copelatus insuetus Guignot, 1941
 Copelatus insulanus Guignot, 1939
 Copelatus integer Sharp, 1882
 Copelatus internus Régimbart, 1904
 Copelatus interstriatus J.Balfour-Browne, 1939
 Copelatus inuber Guignot, 1952
 Copelatus ipiformis Régimbart, 1895
 Copelatus irinus Régimbart, 1899
 Copelatus irregularis W.J. Macleay, 1871
 Copelatus ischius Guignot, 1956
 Copelatus jactator Guignot, 1955
 Copelatus jamaicensis Young, 1942
 Copelatus japonicus Sharp, 1884
 Copelatus jarrigei Legros, 1954
 Copelatus javanus Régimbart, 1883
 Copelatus jocosus Guignot, 1955
 Copelatus johannis Guignot, 1954
 Copelatus kalaharii Gschwendtner, 1935
 Copelatus kammuriensis Tamu & Tsukamoto, 1955
 Copelatus karnatakus Holmen & Vazirani, 1990
 Copelatus kaszabi Guignot, 1956
 Copelatus kilimandjarensis Bilardo & Pederzani, 1972
 Copelatus kindianus Guignot, 1954
 Copelatus kongouensis Bilardo & Rocchi, 1999
 Copelatus koreanus Mori, 1932
 Copelatus laccophilinus Sharp, 1882
 Copelatus laeticulus Sharp, 1882
 Copelatus lamottei Legros, 1954
 Copelatus lanzai Bilardo & Rocchi, 1995
 Copelatus laraensis Bilardo & Rocchi, 1995
 Copelatus lasckonyi Bilardo & Rocchi, 1995
 Copelatus latens Guignot, 1952
 Copelatus laticollis Régimbart, 1899
 Copelatus latifasciatus Bilardo & Rocchi, 1999
 Copelatus latipes Sharp, 1882
 Copelatus latus J.Balfour-Browne, 1950
 Copelatus leonardii Bilardo & Rocchi, 1999
 Copelatus leonensis Legros, 1954
 Copelatus lepersonneae Gschwendtner, 1943
 Copelatus lignosus Guignot, 1955
 Copelatus lineatipennis Guignot, 1955
 Copelatus lineatus (Guérin-Méneville, 1838)
 Copelatus longicornis Sharp, 1882
 Copelatus lootensi Guignot, 1955
 Copelatus louayensis Bilardo & Rocchi, 2004
 Copelatus luctuosus Guignot, 1939
 Copelatus luridescens Régimbart, 1889
 Copelatus luteocinctus Guignot, 1955
 Copelatus luteomaculatus Guignot, 1956
 Copelatus luzonicus Guignot, 1952
 Copelatus macellus Guignot, 1950
 Copelatus madoni Guignot, 1952
 Copelatus mahajanga Pederzani & Hájek, 2005
 Copelatus mahleri Holmen & Vazirani, 1990
 Copelatus makokouensis Bilardo & Rocchi, 1995
 Copelatus malaisei Guignot, 1954
 Copelatus mancus Sharp, 1887
 Copelatus marginatus Sharp, 1882
 Copelatus masculinus Régimbart, 1899
 Copelatus massaicus Guignot, 1941
 Copelatus mathani Guignot, 1952
 Copelatus mbokoensis Bilardo & Rocchi, 2006
 Copelatus melanogrammus Régimbart, 1883
 Copelatus mimetes Guignot, 1957
 Copelatus minimus Bilardo & Rocchi, 1995
 Copelatus minor Bilardo & Pederzani, 1978
 Copelatus minutissimus J.Balfour-Browne, 1939
 Copelatus mocquerysi Régimbart, 1895
 Copelatus mohelicus Guignot, 1959
 Copelatus monticola Guignot, 1951
 Copelatus montivagus Young, 1942
 Copelatus mulangensis Bameul, 2003
 Copelatus mundus Sharp, 1882
 Copelatus mutabilis Bilardo & Rocchi, 1999
 Copelatus mvoungensis Bilardo & Rocchi, 2004
 Copelatus mysorensis Vazirani, 1970
 Copelatus nakamurai Guéorguiev, 1970
 Copelatus nangaensis Guignot, 1952
 Copelatus nauclerus Guignot, 1939
 Copelatus neavei J.Balfour-Browne, 1950
 Copelatus neelumae Vazirani, 1973
 Copelatus neoguineensis Zimmermann, 1919
 Copelatus nigricans Sharp, 1882
 Copelatus nigrolineatus Sharp, 1882
 Copelatus nigropennis Zimmermann, 1927
 Copelatus nigrostriatus Régimbart, 1895
 Copelatus nilssoni Wewalka, 1982
 Copelatus nimbaensis Legros, 1958
 Copelatus nitens Bilardo & Rocchi, 1999
 Copelatus nitidus Sharp, 1882
 Copelatus nodieri Régimbart, 1895
 Copelatus normalis Erichson, 1847
 Copelatus notius Omer-Cooper, 1965
 Copelatus nzei Bilardo & Rocchi, 1999
 Copelatus oblitus Sharp, 1882
 Copelatus obscurus Sharp, 1882
 Copelatus occultus Bilardo & Rocchi, 1995
 Copelatus ogasawarensis Kamiya, 1932
 Copelatus onorei Pederzani & Rocchi, 1982
 Copelatus ornatipennis Zimmermann, 1926
 Copelatus owas Régimbart, 1895
 Copelatus pachys Guignot, 1955
 Copelatus pallidus Régimbart, 1895
 Copelatus paludorum Guignot, 1952
 Copelatus pandanorum Scott, 1912
 Copelatus pantosi Guignot, 1958
 Copelatus papuensis J.Balfour-Browne, 1939
 Copelatus parabaptus Guignot, 1955
 Copelatus parallelipipedus Régimbart, 1895
 Copelatus parallelus Zimmermann, 1920
 Copelatus pardii Rocchi, 1990
 Copelatus parisii Guignot, 1959
 Copelatus parumstriatus Gschwendtner, 1934
 Copelatus paryphes Guignot, 1955
 Copelatus pederzanii Bilardo & Rocchi, 1995
 Copelatus pereirai Guignot, 1955
 Copelatus peridinus Guignot, 1955
 Copelatus pinnifer Guignot, 1952
 Copelatus piriensis Omer-Cooper, 1965
 Copelatus platynotus Régimbart, 1895
 Copelatus polystrigus Sharp, 1882
 Copelatus ponomarenkoi Riha, 1974
 Copelatus portior Guignot, 1956
 Copelatus posticatus (Fabricius, 1801)
 Copelatus poungai Bilardo & Rocchi, 2006
 Copelatus predaveterus K.B.Miller, 2003
 Copelatus prolixus Sharp, 1882
 Copelatus prolongatus Sharp, 1882
 Copelatus propino Guignot, 1960
 Copelatus propinquus Régimbart, 1895
 Copelatus proximus Sharp, 1882
 Copelatus pulchellus (Klug, 1834)
 Copelatus pulicarius Régimbart, 1895
 Copelatus pumilus Régimbart, 1895
 Copelatus punctatus Bilardo & Rocchi, 1995
 Copelatus punctulatus Aubé, 1838
 Copelatus quadrisignatus Régimbart, 1877
 Copelatus racenisi Guignot, 1951
 Copelatus ragazzii Régimbart, 1887
 Copelatus regimbarti Branden, 1885
 Copelatus restrictus Sharp, 1882
 Copelatus rimosus Guignot, 1952
 Copelatus rivalis Guignot, 1952
 Copelatus rocchii Bilardo, 1982
 Copelatus romani Zimmermann, 1924
 Copelatus royi Legros, 1958
 Copelatus rubiginosus Guignot, 1954
 Copelatus ruficapillus Régimbart, 1895
 Copelatus ruteri Legros, 1954
 Copelatus saegeri Guignot, 1955
 Copelatus sahlbergi J.Balfour-Browne, 1939
 Copelatus sallaei Sharp, 1882
 Copelatus sanfilippoi Bilardo & Pederzani, 1972
 Copelatus scalptus Guignot, 1954
 Copelatus scaphites Guignot, 1955
 Copelatus schaefferi Young, 1942
 Copelatus schereri Wewalka, 1981
 Copelatus schuhi Hendrich & Balke, 1998
 Copelatus scutatus Guignot, 1952
 Copelatus scytalotus Guignot, 1956
 Copelatus senegalensis Lagar & Hernando, 1991
 Copelatus sexstriatus Sharp, 1882
 Copelatus sharpi Branden, 1885
 Copelatus silvestrii Régimbart, 1903
 Copelatus simoni Régimbart, 1889
 Copelatus singularis Bilardo & Rocchi, 1995
 Copelatus sociennus J.Balfour-Browne, 1952
 Copelatus solitarius Sharp, 1882
 Copelatus sordidipennis Régimbart, 1895
 Copelatus spangleri Vazirani, 1974
 Copelatus speciosus Régimbart, 1892
 Copelatus spoliatus Guignot, 1955
 Copelatus stavropolitanus Riha, 1974
 Copelatus stillicidicola Bilardo & Rocchi, 1995
 Copelatus striatellus Boheman, 1848
 Copelatus striaticollis Lucas, 1857
 Copelatus striatopterus Aubé, 1838
 Copelatus striatulus Aubé, 1838
 Copelatus strigipennis (Laporte, 1835)
 Copelatus strigosulus (Fairmaire, 1878)
 Copelatus strinatii Guignot, 1958
 Copelatus striolatus Peschet, 1917
 Copelatus stygis Guignot, 1958
 Copelatus subdeficiens Régimbart, 1902
 Copelatus subsimilis Guignot, 1958
 Copelatus substriatus Kirsch, 1873
 Copelatus subterraneus Guéorguiev, 1978
 Copelatus sudrei Bameul, 2003
 Copelatus sulcatus Sharp, 1882
 Copelatus sulcipennis (Laporte, 1835)
 Copelatus sumbawensis Régimbart, 1899
 Copelatus suppar Guignot, 1956
 Copelatus supplementaris Régimbart, 1895
 Copelatus sylvaticus Guignot, 1952
 Copelatus takakurai Satô, 1985
 Copelatus tanaus Guignot, 1953
 Copelatus taprobanicus Wewalka & Vazirani, 1985
 Copelatus tenebrosus Régimbart, 1880
 Copelatus teranishii Kamiya, 1938
 Copelatus terminalis Sharp, 1882
 Copelatus ternatensis Régimbart, 1899
 Copelatus thiriouxi Peschet, 1917
 Copelatus thrasys Guignot, 1952
 Copelatus tibialis Sharp, 1882
 Copelatus tinctor Guignot, 1954
 Copelatus togoensis Régimbart, 1895
 Copelatus tomokunii Satô, 1985
 Copelatus tostus J.Balfour-Browne, 1950
 Copelatus trifilis Guignot, 1958
 Copelatus triglyphus Guignot, 1955
 Copelatus trilobatus Régimbart, 1895
 Copelatus tschaga Bilardo & Pederzani, 1972
 Copelatus tucuchiensis J.Balfour-Browne, 1939
 Copelatus tulagicus Guignot, 1942
 Copelatus uludanuensis Hendrich & Balke, 1995
 Copelatus undecimstriatus Aubé, 1838
 Copelatus unguicularis Régimbart, 1903
 Copelatus usagarensis Zimmermann, 1926
 Copelatus vagatus Guignot, 1952
 Copelatus vagestriatus Zimmermann, 1919
 Copelatus vagus Bilardo & Rocchi, 1995
 Copelatus validus Sharp, 1882
 Copelatus vanninii Bilardo & Rocchi, 1999
 Copelatus variegatus Régimbart, 1895
 Copelatus venustus Bilardo & Rocchi, 1995
 Copelatus vigintistriatus Fairmaire, 1869
 Copelatus vigintisulcatus Régimbart, 1895
 Copelatus villiersi Guignot, 1950
 Copelatus virungaensis Bilardo, 1982
 Copelatus vitraci Legros, 1948
 Copelatus vivax Guignot, 1953
 Copelatus wallacei J.Balfour-Browne, 1939
 Copelatus waltoni J.Balfour-Browne, 1950
 Copelatus wewalkai Holmen & Vazirani, 1990
 Copelatus weymarni J.Balfour-Browne, 1947
 Copelatus xanthocephalus Régimbart, 1899
 Copelatus yacumensis Guignot, 1957
 Copelatus zadiensis Bilardo & Rocchi, 1995
 Copelatus zimmermanni Gschwendtner, 1934

References

External links
 

 

 
Dytiscidae genera
Beetles described in 1832
Beetles of Africa
Beetles of Asia
Beetles of Europe
Beetles of North America
Beetles of Australia
Beetles of New Zealand